Uniacke may refer to:

Given name 
Charles Uniacke Mader (1856–1929), merchant and political figure in Nova Scotia, Canada

Surname 
Andrew Mitchell Uniacke (1808–1895), lawyer, banker, and politician in Nova Scotia
Desmond Uniacke (1895–1933), British World War I flying ace
James Uniacke (MP) (1736–1803), MP for Youghal (Parliament of Ireland constituency)
James Boyle Uniacke (1799–1858), first Premier of the colony of Nova Scotia
Luke Davies-Uniacke, Australian rules footballer with AFL club North Melbourne
Norman Fitzgerald Uniacke (died 1846), lawyer, judge, and political figure in Lower Canada and Nova Scotia
Richard G. F. Uniacke (1867–1934), British genealogist and librarian
Richard John Uniacke (1753–1830), abolitionist, attorney general, member of Nova Scotia House of Assembly
Robert Uniacke (1753–1802), MP for Youghal (Parliament of Ireland constituency)
Robert Uniacke Fitzgerald (1771–1842), Irish politician
Robert Fitzgerald Uniacke (1797–1870), clergyman in Halifax, Nova Scotia
Robert Uniacke-Penrose-Fitzgerald (1839–1919), British Conservative politician
Thomas Uniacke (died 1734), Irish politician, briefly sat as MP for Dungarvan (Parliament of Ireland constituency)

Places 
East Uniacke, Nova Scotia, small community in Hants County, Nova Scotia, Canada
Mount Uniacke, Nova Scotia, unincorporated community in Hants County, Nova Scotia, Canada
South Uniacke, Nova Scotia, small community in Hants County, Nova Scotia, Canada
Uniacke Square, public housing residential area in the north central area of Halifax, Nova Scotia
Uniacke Estate Museum Park, centred on the home of Richard John Uniacke at Mount Uniacke
Mount Uniacke, Co Cork, small community Co Cork, Ireland.

See also
Junibacken
UNICE (disambiguation)
Unac (disambiguation)
Unik (disambiguation)